was a Japanese haikai poet of the middle Edo period. He was a wealthy merchant in Ueno, Iga Province, now known as Mie.

On April 3, 1691, Manko met Bashō and led him to his residence, where the former became a pupil. In total, some sixty of his verses were published. His main contributions can be found in Sarumino (1691), Sumidawara (1694), and Zoku-sarumino (1698).

See also
Matsuo Bashō

Notes

References
 

 

1724 deaths
Japanese writers of the Edo period
Year of birth unknown
17th-century Japanese poets